Rikki Gaddie Dworcan (born 2 September 1971) is a South African former professional tennis player.

Gaddie featured in the mixed doubles main draw of the 1988 French Open, partnering Piet Norval. Her best singles performance in a grand slam tournament came at the 1989 Wimbledon Championships, where she made the third round of the qualifying draw.

Often during her doubles career on the professional tour she partnered with her younger sister Toni. The sisters now run the Champion Academy in Johannesburg, a personal development training academy for athletes and businesses.

ITF finals

Doubles: 1 (0–1)

References

External links
 
 

1971 births
Living people
South African female tennis players
Tennis players from Johannesburg